Kokořín is a municipality and village in Mělník District in the Central Bohemian Region of the Czech Republic. It has about 400 inhabitants. Kokořín is known for the Kokořín Castle.

Administrative parts
Villages of Březinka, Janova Ves, Kokořínský Důl, Šemanovice and Truskavna are administrative parts of Kokořín.

Sights

The main landmark is the Kokořín Castle. It is a medieval fortress carved in the local sandstone. The first written mention of the castle and the settlement is from 1320.

Notable people
Václav Bolemír Nebeský (1818–1882), poet and translator

References

External links

Villages in Mělník District